HMS Marshal Soult was a Royal Navy  monitor constructed in the opening years of the First World War. Laid down as M14, she was named after the French general of the Napoleonic Wars Marshal Nicolas Jean de Dieu Soult. She served in both World Wars and was decommissioned in 1946.

Design
Designed for inshore operations along the sandbank strewn Belgian coastline, Marshal Soult was equipped with two  battleship guns. Originally, these guns were to have been stripped from one of the battlecruisers  and  after they were redesigned. However the guns were not ready, and guns intended for the battleship  were used instead.

The diesel engines used by the ships were a constant source of technical difficulty, restricting their use.

Service
Marshal Soult performed numerous bombardment operations against German positions in Flanders, including during the First Ostend Raid in April 1918. In October 1918, she became a tender to the gunnery school HMS Excellent at Portsmouth and in March 1919 undertook a similar role at Devonport before paying off in March 1921. Recommissioned in 1924, she moved to Chatham in April 1926 as a training ship.

Her armament was removed in March 1940 and was later fitted to the new  monitor , which was completed in 1941.

In the year of her launch 1915, Caretta, an Admiralty Pinnace was assigned to her.

She served throughout the Second World War as a depot ship for trawlers at Portsmouth until being sold on 10 July 1946 and scrapped at Troon.

See also 
 Commander R.D. Binney: his first command, in 1930, was the Marshal Soult

References
  Vol. 1 • Vol. 2

Dittmar, F. J. & Colledge, J. J., "British Warships 1914-1919", (Ian Allan, London, 1972), 

Gray, Randal (ed), "Conway's All the World's Fighting Ships 1906–1921", (Conway Maritime Press, London, 1985), 

 

1915 ships
Marshal Ney-class monitors
Ships built on the River Tyne
World War I monitors of the United Kingdom